Karena Wihongi (born 29 September 1979, in New Zealand) is a New Zealand rugby union footballer. He plays as a prop, and has "a reputation for powerful scrummaging courtesy of his hefty 19st 9lb, 6ft 1in frame." He previously played his club rugby for the Aviva Premiership side Sale Sharks, to whom he was signed in 2010. He came from former French clubs Oyonnax Rugby and CS Bourgoin Jallieu; he is a French qualified player based on residency. The Sale Sharks' coach stated that "He was on my priority list as soon as I was appointed and was delighted when he signed on the dotted line." He currently plays for Castres Olympique in the Top 14.

Honours

Club 
 Castres
Top 14: 2012–13

References

External links
 

New Zealand rugby union players
1979 births
Sale Sharks players
CS Bourgoin-Jallieu players
Living people
US Carcassonne players
Rugby union props